The following is a list of radio stations in Monaco.

Monte Carlo

Monaco
Radio
Radio